Thomastown Railway Station serves the town of Thomastown in County Kilkenny, Ireland.

It is a station on the Dublin to Waterford Intercity route.

Unlike most other railway stations on the network, tickets are not available for purchase at Thomastown station and must be obtained on the train.

There is a disused low platform and signal box across the track. The track was removed from it in 2004 when mini-CTC signalling was installed.

History
The station opened on 12 May 1848.

See also
 List of railway stations in Ireland

References

External links

Irish Rail Thomastown Station Website

Iarnród Éireann stations in County Kilkenny
Railway stations in County Kilkenny
Railway stations opened in 1848
Railway stations in the Republic of Ireland opened in 1848